Sergio Samitier Samitier (born 31 August 1995 in Barbastro) is a Spanish cyclist, who currently rides for UCI WorldTeam . In August 2019, he was named in the startlist for the 2019 Vuelta a España. In October 2020, he was named in the startlist for the 2020 Giro d'Italia.

Major results
2016
 4th Time trial, National Under–23 Road Championships
2017
 2nd Time trial, National Under–23 Road Championships
2019
  Combativity award Stage 15 Vuelta a España
2021 
 6th Overall Settimana Ciclistica Italiana

Grand Tour general classification results timeline

References

External links

1995 births
Living people
Spanish male cyclists
Cyclists from Aragon
People from Barbastro
Sportspeople from the Province of Huesca